The Nissan Philippines, Inc. is a joint venture between Nissan Motor Company, Universal Motors Corporation and Yulon Philippines Investment Co. Ltd. for the import and distribution of Nissan automobiles, multi-purpose vehicles (MPV) and sport utility vehicles (SUV) in the Philippines.

History

Nissan Motor Company entered the Philippine market in 1969 with the appointment of Universal Motors Corporation (UMC) as the authorized assembler and distributor of Datsun cars and pickups. UMC started assembling vehicles in their Pasong Tamo, Makati facility. Included in the vehicles assembled were the Datsun 620 pick up with the 1.5 L J15 I4 engine. Later, it brought in the Datsun 720 Double Cab pick-up with the carbureted L20B I4. It also did pre-delivery inspection on the Nissan Cedric (Series 130, also called the Datsun 2400 Super Six), the Nissan Laurel and the Nissan Bluebird.

In 1983, Nissan Motor Company established Pilipinas Nissan, Inc. (PNI), a joint-venture with Marubeni, to assemble and distribute Nissan passenger cars. The company took over the former Volkswagen (DMG, Inc.) assembly plant in E. Rodriguez Sr. Ave., Quezon City and refitted it to meet the specifications required by Nissan Japan. The first models it assembled were the Nissan Pulsar (N12) and the Nissan Stanza (T11, known elsewhere as the Nissan Violet). By this time, UMC focused on the Nissan light commercial vehicles (SUVs and pickups). In November 1991, PNI was renamed Nissan Motor Philippines, Inc. (NMPI). In September 2000, the Yulon group acquired control of NMPI from Nissan Motor Company.

In September 2013, Nissan Motor Company reorganized its Philippine business with the establishment of Nissan Philippines, Inc. (NPI) as the sole national sales company for the Philippines, assuming direct control over the entire Philippine operations of Nissan. The new company is a joint-venture between Nissan Motor Company (51%), UMC (24.5%) and Yulon (24.5%). With the establishment of the new company, UMC and NMPI (renamed Univation Motor Philippines, Inc. in October 2014, after the Nissan reorganization) will continue as assemblers for NPI.

In January 2021, Nissan Philippines announced that it will shut down its plant in Santa Rosa, Laguna in March. Ceasing local production of the Nissan Almera in which it has been assembling in the Santa Rosa plant since 2013. Although its marketing and distribution network will still continue selling its vehicles produced in Thailand and Japan.

Nissan would be the third vehicle maker in Santa Rosa to cease operations, after Ford Motor Company in 2012 and Honda Motor Company in 2020.

Nissan has also plans for Mitsubishi Motors Philippines Corporation to produce the Navara and Terra at its plant in Santa Rosa, Laguna.

Vehicles marketed

Current
Nissan Almera - Locally Produced then transferred production to Thailand
Nissan Navara - Imported from Thailand
Nissan Terra - Imported from Thailand
Nissan Patrol Royale - Imported from Japan
Nissan NV350 Urvan - Imported from Japan
Nissan Leaf - Imported from Japan
Nissan 370Z - Imported from Japan
Nissan GT-R - Imported from Japan
Nissan Kicks - Imports from Thailand
Nissan Livina - Imported from Indonesia

Former
Nissan Sentra (1987–2002) - Locally Produced
Nissan Sentra (Pulsar-Based) (N16) (2001–2014) - Locally Produced
Nissan Sentra 200 (B16) (2010–2014) - Locally Produced
Nissan Cefiro (1989–2007) - Locally Produced
Nissan Teana (2006–2014) - Imported from Thailand
Nissan Maxima (1987–1990) - Locally Produced
Nissan Bluebird (1990–1993) - Locally Produced
Nissan Bluebird Altima (U13) (1993–1998) - Locally Produced
Nissan Altima (L33) (2014–2019) - Imported from Japan
Nissan Terrano (1996–2000) - Imported from Japan
Nissan Murano (2006–2016) - Imported from Japan
Nissan Vanette (1993–2001) - Locally Produced
Nissan Urvan Shuttle (1988–2015) - Locally Produced
Nissan Urvan Escapade (1998–2015) - Locally Produced
Nissan Urvan Estate (2002–2014) - Locally Produced
Nissan Serena (C24) (2002–2012) - Locally Produced
Nissan Grand Livina (2008–2016) - Imported from Indonesia
Nissan Safari (1990–2000) - Locally Produced
Nissan Patrol Super Safari (2000–2018) - Locally Produced
Nissan Juke (2016–2021) - Imported from Thailand 
Nissan Sylphy (2014–2021) - Imported from Thailand 
Nissan Power Eagle (1991–1998) - Locally Produced
Nissan Frontier (1998–2008) - Locally Produced
Nissan Frontier Bravado (2006–2014) - Locally Produced
Nissan Frontier Navara (2008–2015) - Locally Produced
Nissan AD Max (Y10) (1997–2000) - Locally Produced 
Nissan Verita (K11) (2000–2007) - Locally Produced
Nissan X-Trail (T30) (2003–2014) - Imported from Japan
Nissan X-Trail (T31) (2010–2014) - Imported from Japan
Nissan X-Trail (T32) (2014–2021) - Imported from Japan

References

External links
Nissan Philippines, Inc. official website

Nissan
Automotive companies of the Philippines
Vehicle manufacturing companies established in 2013
Companies based in Bonifacio Global City
2013 establishments in the Philippines
Philippine subsidiaries of foreign companies